Ravne, which translates from Serbo-Croatian as Straight, may refer to several places in Slovenia:

Drežniške Ravne, a settlement in the Municipality of Kobarid
Grgarske Ravne, a settlement in the Municipality of Nova Gorica
Kneške Ravne, a settlement in the Municipality of Tolmin
Livške Ravne, a settlement in the Municipality of Kobarid
Ravne, Cerknica, a settlement in the Municipality of Cerknica
Ravne, Kočevje, a hamlet in the Municipality of Kočevje
Ravne, Železniki, a settlement in the Municipality of Železniki
Ravne, Ajdovščina, a settlement in the Municipality of Ajdovščina
Ravne Castle, a castle near the town of Ravne na Koroškem
Ravne, Cerklje na Gorenjskem, a settlement in the Municipality of Cerklje na Gorenjskem
Ravne na Blokah, a settlement in the Municipality of Bloke
Ravne na Koroškem, a town, the administrative centre of the Municipality of Ravne na Koroškem
Ravne pri Šmartnem, a settlement in the Municipality of Kamnik 
Ravne pri Žireh, a settlement in the Municipality of Žiri
Ravne pri Cerknem, a settlement in the Municipality of Cerkno
Ravne v Bohinju, a settlement in the Municipality of Bohinj
Tolminske Ravne, a settlement in the Municipality of Tolmin

and in Bosnia and Herzegovina

 Ravne, Kladanj, a settlement in the Municipality of Kladanj
 Ravne, Vareš, a settlement in the Municipality of Vareš